Keifer may refer to:

 Keifer, a microprocessor architecture
 Joseph Warren Keifer (1836-1932), United States Army general and Speaker of the House
 Tom Keifer (born 1961), United States rock musician

See also 
 Kiefer (disambiguation)
 Kefir, a fermented milk drink